Datuk Rizam Ismail is a Malaysian politician who has served as Political Secretary to the Minister of International Trade and Industry Tengku Zafrul Aziz since January 2023, State Leader of the Opposition of Selangor since June 2018 and Member of the Selangor State Legislative Assembly (MLA) for Sungai Air Tawar since May 2018. He is a member and State Youth Chief of Selangor of the United Malay National Organisation (UMNO), a component party of the Barisan Nasional (BN) coalition.

Election results
Selangor State Legislative Assembly

Honours
  :
  Knight Commander of the Order of the Territorial Crown (PMW) – Datuk (2021)

References

1981 births
Living people
Selangor politicians
Members of the Selangor State Legislative Assembly
United Malays National Organisation politicians